Yelena Tumanova (born 31 May 1965) is a Soviet speed skater. She competed in three events at the 1988 Winter Olympics. Her son, Boris Katchouk, is a professional ice hockey player.

References

External links
 

1965 births
Living people
Soviet female speed skaters
Olympic speed skaters of the Soviet Union
Speed skaters at the 1988 Winter Olympics
Place of birth missing (living people)